is a former Japanese football player.

Playing career
Mihara was born in Saga Prefecture on April 20, 1978. After graduating from high school, he joined J1 League club Nagoya Grampus Eight in 1997. However he could not play at all in the match until 2000. He also played for Romanian club Universitatea Craiova in 1999. In June 2000, he moved to his local club Sagan Tosu in J2 League with Jiro Yabe on loan. He played as regular player. In 2001, he returned to Nagoya Grampus Eight. However he could hardly play in the match. In June 2002, he moved to J2 club Avispa Fukuoka and played many matches. In 2003, he moved to J2 club Consadole Sapporo. However he could not play many matches for injuries. In 2006, he moved to Japan Football League club FC Ryukyu. He retired end of 2007 season.

Club statistics

References

External links

1978 births
Living people
Association football people from Saga Prefecture
Japanese footballers
Japanese expatriate footballers
J1 League players
J2 League players
Japan Football League players
Nagoya Grampus players
Sagan Tosu players
Avispa Fukuoka players
Hokkaido Consadole Sapporo players
FC Ryukyu players
Association football midfielders